Dany Brillant (né Daniel Cohen-Biran, 28 December 1965 in Tunis), is a French singer of a Jewish-Tunisian origin.

Born in Tunis, his parents immigrated to France while he was a newborn infant. They settled in Sainte-Geneviève-des-Bois near Paris. His uncle Nathan, was a famous luth player and interpreter of oriental music. At age 12, Dany Brilliant's family moved to Paris and at 14 his grandfather gave him a guitar. He started performing at various events, including important debut at cabaret "Aux Trois Maillets" where he got his artistic name. His adopted  name Brillant comes after Jacques Boni, the owner of the cabaret invited him to stage by saying: "Dany! Sois brillant!" (Dany! be brilliant!).

In June 2005, Brillant appeared on Les stars chantent leurs idoles, on France 2, alongside stars such as Julio Iglesias and Il Divo.

Discography

Studio albums

Compilation albums

Singles 
(selective charting songs on SNEP)

Filmography

Films 
1995: Le Nouveau Monde (English title New World  as the singer)
1996: Des nouvelles du bon Dieu
2004: Les seins de ma prof d'anglais as Monsieur Lambert
2006: Changement d'adresse as Julien
2008: Astérix aux Jeux olympiques (English title Asterix at the Olympic Games)
2008: Le Grand Alibi (English title The Great Alibi) as Michel the taxi driver and the factotum of Léa
2009: Fais-moi plaisir! as Rudolph
2012: La Vérité si je mens! 3 as himself

Television 
2004: Les Cordier, juge et flic (TV series) as Lucas (Cordier's cousin)
2008: Roméro et Juliette (TV film) as lead actor Patrice Roméro

References

External links
Official website
 Biography of Dany Brillant, from Radio France Internationale

1965 births
Living people
Jewish singers
Tunisian emigrants to France
Tunisian Jews
French male singers
Cours Florent alumni